

The women's 1 km time trial track events in cycling at the 2004 Summer Paralympics were held at the Olympic Velodrome on 18 and 21 September.

There were two classes, one for blind and visually impaired competitors, the second combining cerebral palsy and locomotor disabilities.

B 1–3

The tandem B1–3 event was won by Aileen McGlynn and her sighted pilot Ellen Hunter, representing .

Final round
18 Sept. 2004, 12:50

LC 1–4/CP 3/4

The LC1–4/CP 3/4 event was won by Zhou Ju Fang, representing , in a Chinese clean sweep. Standings were decided by calculated times.

Final round
21 Sept. 2004, 13:10

References

Cycling at the 2004 Summer Paralympics
Para